Vivaldo Leandro Semedo Moura Sousa (born 28 January 2005) is a professional footballer who plays as a striker for  club Udinese. Born in Angola, he is a youth international for Portugal.

Club career
Semedo is a youth product of Povoense, and joined the youth academy of Sporting CP in 2018. On 6 May 2021, he signed his first professional contract with Sporting. In his final season with the Sporting U17s, he scored 23 goals in 24 games. On 25 August 2022, he transferred to Udinese signing a 3-year contract. He made his professional and senior debut with Udinese as a late substitute in a 1–1 tie with Hellas Verona on 30 January 2023.

International career
Semedo was born in Angola, and moved to Portugal at a young age. He is a youth international for Portugal, having played up to the Portugal U18s.

References

External links

FPF Profile

2005 births
Living people
Footballers from Luanda
Portuguese footballers
Portugal youth international footballers
Angolan footballers
Angolan emigrants to Portugal
Portuguese sportspeople of Angolan descent
Footballers from Lisbon
Association football forwards
Serie A players
Udinese Calcio players
Portuguese expatriate footballers
Expatriate footballers in Italy
Portuguese expatriate sportspeople in Italy